Paul Siever (born August 10, 1969) is a former American football offensive tackle in the National Football League for the Washington Redskins, Jacksonville Jaguars, and Chicago Bears. He played High school football for the Downingtown Whippets and college football for Penn State University. He was an All-American in both High School and College. He is currently the Assistant Principal at the Technical College High School - Pennocks Bridge Campus.

References

1969 births
Living people
American football offensive tackles
Penn State Nittany Lions football players
Washington Redskins players